Cycloartenol is an important triterpenoid of the sterol class which is found in plants. It is the starting point for the synthesis of almost all plant steroids, making them chemically distinct from the steroids of fungi and animals, which are, instead, produced from lanosterol.

Synthesis
The biosynthesis of cycloartenol starts from the triterpenoid squalene. It is the first precursor in the biosynthesis of other stanols and sterols, referred to as phytostanols and phytosterols in photosynthetic organisms and plants. The identities and distribution of phytostanols and phytosterols is characteristic of a plant species.

References 

 
Sterols
Triterpenes
Cyclopropanes